Skull & Bones is the fifth studio album by American hip hop group Cypress Hill, released on April 25, 2000, by Columbia Records. The album's genre and style are divided into two discs — a pure hip hop disc ("Skull") and a nu metal/rap metal disc ("Bones"). It also features guest appearances from Everlast, Eminem, N.O.R.E., Christian Olde Wolbers and Dino Cazares of Fear Factory, Brad Wilk of Rage Against the Machine, and Chino Moreno of Deftones.

Background 
Cypress Hill landed a slot supporting The Offspring and MxPx on the Conspiracy of One tour. The song "(Rock) Superstar" was a radio hit on both rap and rock stations. It was once performed live by the band with Slash, Duff McKagan and Matt Sorum, former members of the rock band Guns N' Roses. The Intro includes a sample from Ralph Bakshi's film Wizards.

Reception 

Rolling Stone - 3.5 stars out of 5 - "A bipolar breakdown…proving hip-hop is more like T2…capable of morphing into anyone they wanna be."
CMJ - "Proves rather convincingly that Cypress Hill still packs a mighty punch."
Vibe - "Marks the first major shift in the group's direction....Half of [the album] is a head-banging jam session....Songs like '(Rap) Superstar' prove that the group still has that winning formula."
The Source - 3.5 mics out of 5 - "May be their most drastic turn yet.… Cypress' flavor runs thick across the disc.… They break down the barriers in order to transcend the industry-imposed terms of alternative and rap…another set for the weeded."
Rap Pages - "May be the best album you hear for the next 2 years.… [It] is so artistically good that it [will] stay in your personal rotation…"
Mojo - "Finds them sticking a finger in the air and finding the wind blowing in the direction of thrash-metal."
NME - 7 out of 10 - "Picks up where the groggy metal/rap melange of '98s Cypress Hill IV left off.… It's business as usual.… They do hip-hop and they do funk-metal rawk…evolving slowly."

Track listing 
Skull & Bones

All tracks produced by DJ Muggs.

Notes 
The untitled instrumental segue after "Stank Ass Hoe" was re-used for the track "Heart of the Assassin" on the 2000 DJ Muggs produced album Soul Assassins II.

Personnel

Cypress Hill
B-Real - vocals
Sen Dog - vocals
DJ Muggs - turntables, sampler
Bobo - drums

Guitarists
Dino Cazares 
Jeremy Fleener 
Rogelio Lozano 
Andy Zambrano 
Alfunction - also keyboards

Bassists
Christian Olde Wolbers 
Reggie Stewart - also guitar

Other personnel
Michael Barbiero - engineering
Brad Wilk - drums

Charts

Weekly charts

Year-end charts

Certifications

References

External links 

2000 albums
Cypress Hill albums
Concept albums
Nu metal albums by American artists
Rap metal albums
Columbia Records albums
Albums produced by DJ Muggs